Athula Sumathipala is a Professor of Psychiatry at Faculty of Health Keele University United Kingdom.

Early life
Sumathipala after attending Nalanda College Colombo entered the Medical Faculty of University of Colombo. In 1980 he graduated as a Medical Doctor gaining a degree of Bachelor of Medicine, Bachelor of Surgery. Consequently, he followed it up with a Diploma of Family medicine (DFM) at Post Graduate Institute of Medicine, University of Colombo in 1985. Sumathipala obtained a degree of MD from the same university in 1990. Later in 2004 he obtained a PhD from University of London.

Career
Sumathipala is also the founder of the Institute for Research and Development, and founder of the Sri Lankan Twin registry. He had authored many books and publications in Psychiatry. Sumathipala works for the World Health Organization in advisory capacity.

References

 

 

 

 

 

 

 

 

 

 

 

 

Sri Lankan Buddhists
Sinhalese physicians
Alumni of Nalanda College, Colombo
Sri Lankan expatriate academics
Living people
Year of birth missing (living people)